Metanema determinata, known generally as the dark metanema or dark-banded thorn, is a species of geometrid moth in the family Geometridae. It is found in North America.

The MONA or Hodges number for Metanema determinata is 6820.

References

Further reading

 
 
 

Ennominae